Blumhardt is a German surname. Notable people with the surname include:

Christoph Blumhardt (1842–1919), German Lutheran theologian
Doreen Blumhardt (1914–2009), New Zealand potter
Johann Blumhardt (1805–1880), German Lutheran theologian

German-language surnames